The Fulham Boys School is an English Church of England free school for boys aged 11 to 18. It was founded by a group of Fulham inhabitants and opened in September 2014. Its initial temporary location was in West Kensington in London however there was a second temporary site at Beaumont Avenue. The permanent site is on the premises of the former Fulham Police Station by Fulham Road.

The Fulham Boys School offers an education specifically geared towards boys.  Its website states: "Through the application of our Christian values, mutual respect, supportive pastoral care and inspirational teaching, we will help every boy to find his unique talent and realise it, for the benefit of all."

The head teacher from  September 2014 is Alun Ebenezer, previously assistant head at St Teilo's Church in Wales High School, a large secondary school in Cardiff.

Although it is a Church of England school, 50% of the places are offered to boys of all faiths and none.

Admission 
Up to eight boys may be admitted on the basis of their sporting aptitude.

References

External links 
 Retrieved March 2021

Secondary schools in the London Borough of Hammersmith and Fulham
Free schools in London
Free Schools in England with a Formal Faith Designation
Educational institutions established in 2014
2014 establishments in England
Church of England secondary schools in the Diocese of London